The 2016 LEB Oro playoffs is the final stage of the 2015–16 LEB Oro season. They will start on 22 April 2016, and will finish on 31 May.

The quarterfinals will be played in a best-of-3 games format, while the semifinals and the finals in a best-of-5 games format. The best seeded team plays at home the games 1, 2 and 5 if necessary. The winner of the finals will promote to the 2016–17 ACB season with Quesos Cerrato Palencia, the champion of the regular season.

Bracket

Quarterfinals

Club Melilla Baloncesto v Cáceres Patrimonio de la Humanidad

San Pablo Inmobiliaria Burgos v Ourense Provincia Termal

Unión Financiera Baloncesto Oviedo v Peñas Huesca

Leyma Básquet Coruña v Cafés Candelas Breogán

Semifinals

Club Melilla Baloncesto v Leyma Básquet Coruña

San Pablo Inmobiliaria Burgos v Peñas Huesca

Finals

References

LEB Oro playoffs
playoff